Sindhanur is a city and taluk headquarter of Sindhanur taluk of Raichur District in  Karnataka. The river Tungabhadra covers the irrigation area by left bank canal. Most of the land in the field is composed of cultivable black soil. Paddy is cultivated using the Tungabhadra River water. Sindhanur is also known as the Paddy Granary of  Raichur. With the availability of Tungabhadra river water, paddy rice is grown twice a year. Sindhanur is the place where the majority of tractor sales take place in Asia. as agricultural activities take place year-round. Sona Masuri and Basmati rice are grown in Sindhanur.

Geography
Sindhanur is a City and City Municipal Council located in Raichur District in the state of Karnataka. Residents prefer the many amenities found in Sindhanur over other district zones in Karnataka. Sindhanur city has 37,040 households and is divided into 31 wards. It has food services like Swiggy. Sindhanur city elections are held every 5 years to elect a representative of each ward.

Economy
Sindhanur is a commercial center and a major focal point for the paddy industry, with its rural areas being important for paddy cultivation – it is considered the Paddy Granary of Raichur.  
The Sindhanur Taluk is the taluk with the most cooperative associations.
Many tractor company showrooms are in Sindhanur, also automobile spare parts sales.

Demographics
As of a 2017 Indian Census, Sindhanur had a population of 116,837 (59,029 male, 57,808 female), representing a 54.06% increase since 2011. The sex-ratio of Sindhanur city is around 994, higher than the state average of 973. Sindhanur City has an average literacy rate of 83.98%, higher than the national average of 59.5%; male literacy is 87.72%, and female literacy is 80.01%. In Sindhanur, 19.44% of the population is under 6 years of age.

Majority of population speak Kannada and minor population speak different languages like Telugu, Bengali, Rajasthani, Urdu, etc. The Ambamma jathre Fair at Sindhanur is famous which is held in January of every year at "Ambamma maTa". An evening fair is a special event here.

Interesting thing to notice about Sindhanur Taluk is its diversity. 20% of the population is Bengali speaking(Bengali camp sindhanur). Rajasthani, Telugu, Urdu are other minor languages.

The dominant religion of town is Hinduism (64.54%) with significant Muslim (32.71%) and Christian (0.46%) populations. Most of the Christians are Roman Catholic. Most of the remaining people follow Sikhism, Jainism and other religions.

References

http://sindhanurcity.mrc.gov.in/

Cities and towns in Raichur district
Taluks of Karnataka